SmarThink is a computer chess engine written by Sergei S. Markoff of Russia. This engine became a Russian computer chess champion in 2004 and CIS computer chess champion in 2005.

References
 http://www.lokasoft.nl/smarthink_120.aspx

Chess engines